Mika Keränen (born 24 November 1973 in Helsinki) is a Finnish-Estonian children's writer, poet and translator. He is best known for his series of Estonian-language crime stories, which are addressed to children. The settings of these stories take place in the Supilinn neighborhood of Tartu.

In 1999, he graduated from University of Tartu, studying the Estonian language as a foreign language. From 2002 to 2006, he was the director of the Estonian Institute in Finland. Since 2006, he returned to Estonia and is living and working in Tartu.

Works
 2008: children's story "Varastatud oranž jalgratas" ('The Stolen Orange Bicycle')
 2009: children's story "Peidetud hõbedane aardelaegas" ('The Hidden Silver Treasure Box')
 2017: children's story "Fantoomrattur" ('The Phantom Cyclist')

References

1973 births
Living people
20th-century Estonian writers
Estonian male poets
20th-century Estonian poets
Estonian children's writers
Finnish children's writers
Estonian women children's writers
Finnish women children's writers
20th-century Finnish writers
Finnish male poets
20th-century Finnish poets
Finnish male writers
Finnish translators
Finnish emigrants to Estonia
Estonian University of Life Sciences alumni
University of Tartu alumni
Writers from Helsinki